The Last Time We Saw Paris is a 1968 live album by Dave Brubeck and his quartet, recorded in Paris during their final tour.

Reception

The initial Billboard review of the album from 29 June 1968 felt that "Brubeck fans will cherish this one...The improvisations of "Swanee River" are provocative and imaginative".

The album was reviewed by Scott Yanow at Allmusic who wrote that "this LP is full of timeless performances". Yanow also felt that "Throughout these extended renditions, Brubeck and altoist Paul Desmond rekindle some of the magic from their concerts of the early '50s while also simultaneously showing just how far they had grown as musicians".

Track listing
 "Swanee River" (Stephen Foster, Dave Brubeck) – 8:47
 "These Foolish Things (Remind Me of You)" (Eric Maschwitz, Jack Strachey, Harry Link) – 12:21
 "Forty Days" (Brubeck) – 7:41
 "One Moment Worth Years" (Brubeck) – 8:03
 "La Paloma Azul (The Blue Dove)" (Traditional) – 6:54
 "Three to Get Ready" (Brubeck) – 5:10

Personnel
Dave Brubeck - piano, arranger, liner notes
Paul Desmond - alto saxophone
Gene Wright - double bass
Joe Morello - drums
Teo Macero - producer
Iola Brubeck - liner notes
Arthur Kendy - engineer

References

1968 live albums
Albums produced by Teo Macero
Columbia Records live albums
Dave Brubeck live albums
Live instrumental albums